Jetta Berrill (born 31 January 1994) is an Irish footballer who plays as a midfielder for Peamount United. She has been a member of the Republic of Ireland women's national team.

Club career

In June 2010, 16-year-old Berrill debuted for Albion Rovers, a club from her native Monasterboice in County Louth. Despite Berrill scoring twice, Rovers lost the match 4–2 to Templeogue.

Berrill made her first Women's National League (WNL) appearances for Peamount United in 2012–13, before she joined UCD Waves in 2014.

In 2017 Berrill left UCD Waves and moved to Hungary to train as a veterinarian. She briefly returned to the WNL when she played for DLR Waves during her 2019 summer vacation.

After completing her Hungarian vet studies in June 2021, Berrill re-joined DLR Waves. She quickly recovered her best form, scoring four goals in four games. In January 2022 she transferred back to Peamount United.

International career

Republic of Ireland women's national football team manager Susan Ronan gave Berrill a call up to the senior squad for the first time in April 2016, for the UEFA Women's Euro 2017 qualifying fixtures against Montenegro and Spain. In August 2016 Ronan named Berrill in a young and predominantly home-based senior squad for a training camp in Wales. She played in two challenge matches against the Welsh hosts, winning praise from Ronan: "In particular, Jetta Berrill played excellently over the two games".

With Ireland already eliminated she won a first competitive cap against Portugal in the final qualifying match at Tallaght Stadium, Dublin on 20 September 2016. Despite Berrill's promising performance as an attacking right-back, she conceded the penalty kick which led to Ireland's 1–0 defeat. She played the first half of a 2–1 home friendly win over the Basque Country on 25 November 2016, being substituted for Savannah McCarthy at half-time. At the 2017 Cyprus Cup Berrill made another brief appearance, as a 90th-minute substitute for Áine O'Gorman in the 2–0 third-place play-off defeat by North Korea.

Berrill also represented Ireland at the 2013 and 2017 Summer Universiades.

References

External links

1994 births
Living people
Republic of Ireland women's association footballers
Women's association football midfielders
Republic of Ireland women's international footballers
Irish expatriates in Hungary
Women's National League (Ireland) players
Peamount United F.C. players
DLR Waves players
Association footballers from County Louth
Alumni of University College Dublin
Republic of Ireland women's youth international footballers